A mobile network operator or MNO (also known as a wireless service provider, wireless carrier, cellular company, or mobile network carrier) is a provider of wireless communications services. The main MNOs in Europe are listed below.

Albania 

Albania as per Q1 2021 has 3.66 million subscribers, out of which there are 2.49 million active users (101% penetration rate). An active user is the number of users that communicated in the last three months.

The regulatory authority for telecommunication in Albania is the Electronic and Postal Communications Authority.

In 2022 4iG group, owning ONE Telecommunications, acquires majority stake of ALBtelecom (80.27%) . Leading to a network merger on 2023.

Andorra 

Andorra has 88,109 mobile subscribers or about 113.63% mobile penetration.

Armenia

As of 2017, Armenia has 3.5 million subscribers in total, and a 120% penetration rate.

Austria

Austria has 13,0 million assigned numbers (i.e. 2,0 2G, 10,8 3G and 0,1 4G SIM cards), or a 151.0% penetration rate (Q4 2014).

The Regulatory Authority for telecommunication in Austria is the Austrian Regulatory Authority for Broadcasting and Telecommunications (RTR).

Azerbaijan 

In December 2005, Azerbaijan had 2 million subscribers in total, a 25% penetration rate. In 2014, Azerbaijan has over 10 million subscribers in total and 130% penetration rate.

Belarus 

Belarus has 12.0 million subscribers in total, or a 126% penetration rate. (Q4 2020)

The Regulatory Authority for telecommunication in Belarus is the Ministry of Communications and Informatization.

Belgium

Belgium has 13.89 million subscribers in total, or a 124% penetration rate (Q4 2014).

The Regulatory Authority for telecommunication in Belgium is the Belgian Institute for Postal services and Telecommunications (BIPT).

Bosnia and Herzegovina 

In December 2016, Bosnia and Herzegovina had 3.404 million subscribers in total, or a  penetration rate (compared to the World Bank population estimate of 2016).

The Regulatory Authority for telecommunication in Bosnia and Herzegovina is the Communications Regulatory Agency (Regulatorna agencija za komunikacije, RAK).

Bulgaria 
 
Bulgaria has 7 902 756 subscribers in total, or a 121,2% penetration rate according to the CRC annual report for 2021.
 
The Regulatory Authority for Telecommunication in Bulgaria is the Communications Regulation Commission (CRC).

Croatia 

Croatia has 4,404,652 subscribers in total, or a 102,8% penetration rate. (4Q 2019)

The Regulatory Authority for telecommunication in Croatia is the Hrvatska agencija za poštu i elektronicke komunikacije (website available in Croatian and English language).

Cyprus

Czech Republic 

The Czech Republic has 16.121 million subscribers in total, or a 151% penetration rate (December 2019).

The Regulatory Authority for telecommunication in the Czech Republic is the Český telekomunikační úřad.

Denmark

Denmark has 8.208 million subscribers in total, or a 146% penetration rate (June 2014). The regulator is the Danish Business Authority.

Estonia

Estonia has 2.524 million subscribers in total, or a 188% penetration rate. (December 2008)

Faroe Islands

The Faroe Islands have 0.059 million subscribers in total (exact number 61,388), or a 126% penetration rate (population 48,652). (2020) The Regulatory Authority for telecommunication in the Faroe Islands is Fjarskiftiseftirlitið.

Finland

Finland has 7.700 million subscribers in total, or a 144.59% penetration rate. (December 2009).

France 

France has 75.5 million subscribers in total, or a 115.2% penetration rate (September 2015).

The Regulatory Authority for telecommunication in France is ARCEP.

Georgia 

As of June 2022, Georgia has 5,252,927 subscribers in total. The Regulatory Authority for telecommunication in Georgia is the Georgian National Communications Commission.

Germany

Germany has 114.1 million subscribers in total, or a 140% penetration rate (December 2011).
The Regulatory Authority for telecommunication in Germany is the Bundesnetzagentur (BNetzA).

Gibraltar

Gibraltar, the British overseas territory has 0.028 million subscribers in total, or a 92.12% penetration rate. (December 2009)

Greece 

In 2020, Greece had 11,412,995 subscribers in total, or 109% subscriptions per 100 inhabitants. The Regulatory Authority for telecommunications in Greece is the Hellenic Telecommunications and Post Commission (EETT).

*Since 2021, all 3G networks in Greece are being shut down in order to free up space for 5G frequencies. Cosmote has shut down its 3G network nationwide in September 2021, while Vodafone and Nova will terminate nationwide 3G networks during the first half of 2023.

Guernsey 

The British Crown dependency Guernsey has 0.055 million subscribers in total, or a 95% penetration rate.  (December 2005)

Hungary 

Hungary has 11.8 million subscribers in total. (December 2017)

The Regulatory Authority for telecommunication in Hungary is NMHH – Nemzeti Média-, és Hírközlési Hatóság.

*900MHz 3G closed in 07.2022, in process of shutting down 2100MHz, complete shutdown expected in 2023

Iceland 

Iceland has 0.470 million subscribers in total, or a 129.19% penetration rate. (July 2019)

The Regulatory Authority for telecommunication in Iceland is Póst- og fjarskiptastofnun.

Ireland 
At the end of March 2022 Ireland had 8.117 million mobile subscribers in total, representing a 158.4% penetration rate. 

If mobile broadband and M2M subscriptions are excluded, the total number of mobile subscribers was 5.414 million, representing a 105.6% penetration rate.

The Regulatory Authority for telecommunication in Ireland is the Commission for Communications Regulation (ComReg).

Isle of Man 

The British Crown dependency Isle of Man has an unknown number of subscribers in total and an unknown percentage penetration rate.

Italy 
As of March 2022, Italy has 106.5 million active lines in total, of whose 78 million are human ones, or a 174% penetration rate. The country's telecom regulator is AGCOM.

In 2016 Wind and 3 Italy have agreed to complete a merger that has been approved by European and national authorities and, since March 2020, all consumer and business offers are sold under the new brand Wind Tre. A new operator, Iliad, entered the Italian market in May 2018 as a consequence of this merger.

Jersey

Kosovo 

Kosovo has 1.88 million subscribers in total, or a 103.47% penetration rate. (June 2018)

Latvia

Latvia has 2.243 million subscribers in total, or a 99.72% penetration rate. (December 2009)

Liechtenstein

Liechtenstein has 0.039 million subscribers in total, or a 105% penetration rate. (April 2015)

The Liechtenstein mobile phone system is attached to Switzerland, customers of these three providers can roam on Swiss networks without additional fees.

Lithuania

Lithuania has 4.941 million subscribers in total, or a 167% penetration rate (25 October 2013).

The regulator is Ryšių Reguliavimo Tarnyba (RRT).

Luxembourg

Luxembourg has 719,000 subscribers in total, or a 148% penetration rate. (December 2009)

Malta

Malta has 0.581 million subscribers in total, or a 137.18% penetration rate (December 2013)

Moldova 

Moldova has 4.263 million subscribers in total, or a 120% penetration rate (2012).

The country's telecommunications regulator is ANRCETI.

Monaco

Monaco has 0.023 million subscribers on the Monaco Telecom network, or a 70.1% penetration rate (December 2009). The French networks are also widely available in Monaco, but they don't disclose subscriber figures for Monaco.

Montenegro 

Montenegro has 1.097.574 subscribers in total, or a 177.02% penetration rate (October 2013).

The Regulatory Authority for telecommunication in Montenegro is Agencija za elektronske komunikacije i poštansku djelatnost.

Netherlands

The Netherlands has 21.182 million subscribers in total, or a 128% penetration rate (December 2009).

North Macedonia 

North Macedonia has 2.299 million subscribers in total, or a 105% penetration rate.

The Regulatory Authority for telecommunication in North Macedonia is AEK.

Norway 

Norway has 5.730 million subscribers in total, or a 108.97% penetration rate (December 2016).

The regulatory authority for telecommunication in Norway is the Norwegian Post and Telecommunications Authority.

Poland 

Poland has 54.1 million subscribers in total (Q4 2020).

The country's telecom regulator is UKE (Urząd Komunikacji Elektronicznej).

Portugal

Portugal has 17.6 million subscribers in total, or a 170.5% penetration rate (13.1 million active subscribers or 127.4% penetration rate). (Q3 2017)

The country's telecom regulator is ANACOM.

Romania 

Romania has 22.6 million active subscribers in total, or a 112% penetration rate. (2020)
The country's telcom regulator is ANCOM.

*refarming of the network to LTE began in 2022, complete shutdown in 2023 (already inactive in some areas)

Russia

The country's telecom regulator is Roskomnadzor.

San Marino 

San Marino has 0.037 million subscribers in total, or a 116.95% penetration rate. (December 2013)

Serbia 
Serbia has 9.1987 million subscribers based on the 3-month customer activity, or a 128.09% penetration rate. (December 2013)

The Regulatory Authority for telecommunication in Serbia is RATEL (Regulatorna agencija za elektronske komunikacije i poštanske usluge).

Slovakia 
Slovakia has 7,68 million subscribers in total, or a 132.79% penetration rate. All facts are based on the 3-month customer activity base. (November 2019)

The Regulatory Authority for electronic communications "telecommunication" in Slovakia is Úrad pre reguláciu elektronických komunikácií a poštových služieb (RÚ).

Slovenia

Slovenia has 2.674.900 subscribers in total, or a 127% penetration rate. (4Q 2022)

The Regulatory Authority for telecommunication in Slovenia is AKOS (Agencija za komunikacijska omrežja in storitve).

Spain

Spain has 57.111 million subscribers in total, or a 120.4% penetration rate. (Aug 2022)

The Regulatory Authority for telecommunication in Spain is CNMC (Comisión Nacional de los Mercados y la Competencia).

Sweden 

Sweden has 14.244 million subscribers in total, or a 148.4% penetration rate (2013)

The country's telcom regulator is Swedish Post and Telecom Authority.

Switzerland 

Switzerland has 11.365 million mobile subscribers and a 138% penetration rate. (December 2014)
The country's telecom regulator is BAKOM.

Turkey

Turkey has 86.3 million subscribers in total, or a 101.9% penetration rate. (2021)

The telecom regulator in Turkey is Information and Communication Technologies Authority (BTK : Bilgi Teknolojileri ve Iletisim Kurumu).

Ukraine 

Ukraine has 55.860 million subscribers in total, or a 129.8% penetration rate. (October, 2018)

The country's telecom regulator is NKRZI.

*Due to the Ukrainian war the national roaming among other operators is free and it includes: voice calls, SMS and mobile 2G / 3G Internet at speeds up to 512 kbit/s.

United Kingdom 

The United Kingdom has 92.0 million subscribers in total, or an approximate 139% penetration rate (31 December 2017).

The country's telecom regulator is Ofcom.

See also 
 List of mobile network operators worldwide
 List of mobile network operators of the Americas
 List of mobile network operators of the Asia Pacific region
 List of mobile network operators of the Middle East and Africa
 List of mobile telephone prefixes by country
 List of telecommunications regulatory bodies
 Mobile Network Codes in ITU region 2xx (Europe)

References 

Europe-related lists
Europe
Mobile telecommunications
Telecommunications in Europe
Telecommunications lists